7th Heaven is a Chicago, Illinois-based rock band created by guitarist Richie Hofherr, Tony Di Giulio, and Michael Mooshey. Formed in 1985, it has continued up to present day with changing band members. The band was named by co-founder Michael Mooshey in 1985. The band name 7th Heaven was named after the line "we'll be right in 7th heaven" from the song "Rock Around the Clock" by Bill Haley & His Comets.

About
7th Heaven is currently managed by NTD Management and signed to NTD Records. They were previously managed by Alec John Such of Bon Jovi and James Young of Styx in 1997-1998. They have sold 100,000 CDs to date. Their acclaimed Silver 30-tracks double CD released in 2004 was a popular release.

The title of their 2008 release 14-track album USA-UK comes from joining of the Northern Ireland singer, Keith Semple joining the American AOR band. Semple had been in Popstars: The Rivals a UK singing competition and had eventually become a member of boy band One True Voice during the period 2002-2003, before the band broke up. Semple had a gold record with One True Voice mainly through their double A side hit "Sacred Trust/After You're Gone" that had reached #2 in the British music charts.

The band released the album entitled Jukebox in 2010 on the occasion of the band's 25 years. It contains 15 cds with almost 300 of the band's song from its start to then. They have also recorded another Semple-led album entitled Pop Media in 2011 containing 22 new songs.

In January 2013, Keith Semple left the band and was replaced by Anthony Fedorov as lead singer. In June of that year, they released the album Synergy. On August 22, 2013 the band announced that Fedorov was no longer in the band. After Federov's departure, Keith Semple became the band's temporary lead vocalist.

On December 1, 2014, Adam Blair was announced as the new lead singer. Adam has also been in bands such as Dot Dot Dot, Adam and the Go Comets and The Fabulous Janes. Dot Dot Dot was featured on FOX's The Next Great American Band.

Besides performing around 200 shows a year in the Chicago area, 7th Heaven performs on the "Chicago Music Cruise" every January in the Caribbean; as well as Las Vegas every couple years.

Members

Current members
Richard Hofherr - guitars, vocals, keyboards (co-founder)
Adam Heisler - lead vocals, guitar
Mark Kennetz - bass, vocals
Nick Cox - guitar, vocals
Frankie Harchut - drums

Former members
Tony DiGiulio (co-founder)
Michael Mooshey (co-founder)
Tony Golec
Danny Weymouth
Andrew Blake
Dan Miller
Mark Jones
Matt Clark
Erica Heiden
Stephen Jensen
Alby Odum
Dave Carozzo
Dean Cutenelli
Chris Senior
Keith Semple
Anthony Fedorov
Tamara Mooshey
Tony Davis
Carl Cichanski
Dan O'Brien
Scot Coogan
James Bluthardt
Chris Mosher

Discography

Studio albums
1990: The Time Has Come
1998: Media Overkill
1999: Pop Life
2000: Faces Time Replaces
2003: Silver
2008: U.S.A - U.K.
2011: Pop Media
2013: Synergy
2014: Spectrum
2015: Next
2017: Luminous
2018: Color in Motion
2020: Be Here

Live albums
2005: Live at Durty Nellies (included in the Live at Durty Nellies DVD)

Christmas albums
2004: Christmas CD
2012: Merry Christmas in Chicago (includes new songs and different versions of the songs which were also included on Christmas CD)
2018: Christmas 2018 (includes new songs and different versions of the songs which were also included on Christmas CD and Merry Christmas in Chicago)

Remix albums
2013: Dance Media (includes dance remixes of some songs of the studio album Pop Media)

Cover albums
2004: Sampler – Vol. 1 (includes the "Rock medley" and eight more cover songs)
2009: Pop Medley 2 (includes a medley of several pop and rock songs)
2009: Unplugged (not really an unplugged album, includes also non unplugged songs)
2015: Pop Medley 3 (includes a medley of several pop and rock songs)
2017: Pop Medley 4 (includes a medley of several pop and rock songs)
2019: Covered

Compilations
2007: Medley CD (includes "Pop Medley 1" and "Rock Medley")
2010: Medley CD/DVD (includes "Pop Medley 1", "Pop Medley" 2 and "Rock Medley")
2010: Jukebox (consists of 15 CDs with almost 300 hundred songs and one DVD of 700 songs)
2015: The Best of 1985–2015

Videography

DVDs and Blu-Rays
2005: Live at Durty Nellies (includes also an audio CD of the concert)
2010: Live at Soldier Field
2011: Live at Schaumburg Septemberfest
2014: Return to Schaumburg Live
2015: Live on the Oasis of the Seas
2018: Live on the Harmony of the Seas 2017

In popular culture
7th Heaven is listed in the "Bon Jovi" display at the "Rock and Roll Hall of Fame"
Performed on The Jenny Jones Show (with over 75 Million Viewers Worldwide)
Performed the National Anthem at the United Center - Chicago Bulls - L.A. Lakers basketball game on March 21, 2009
They opened for Bon Jovi and Kid Rock at Soldier Field in Chicago on July 30, 2010 after winning the popular vote in an online-based contest
Adam Blair Heisler was on FOX's The Next Great American Band
Anthony Federov was on Season 4 of American Idol
Keith Semple is on 2015 Season 9 of The Voice on NBC
Natalie Yacovazzi is on 2015 Season 9 of The Voice on NBC
7th Heaven original "Beautiful Life" is on MTV's "Teen Mom" Volume 20, #11 "Trouble in Paradise"

References

External links
7th Heaven official website

Rock music groups from Illinois
1985 establishments in Illinois
Musical groups established in 1985